COVID-19 scams are frauds whose cover story primarily relies on the existence of the COVID-19 pandemic. Such scams have been reported in multiple countries, primarily the United States, Canada and the United Kingdom.

Initiation
COVID-19 scams are initiated in a variety of ways, such as by robocalls, emails, fake blog and social media posts and text messaging.

Types of scams

Benefit/grant scams
In this variation of COVID-19 scams, the fraudster claims that the victim is eligible for a COVID-19 benefit payment. This scam is a derivative of the advance-fee scam, where the scammer will ask the victim for a small payment in return for the 'benefit'. The scammer will then ask for further payments under the guise of problems, until the victim refuses to pay any further.

Authority impersonation scams
The United Nations WHO has issued a warning that fraudsters posing as employees of the WHO were attempting to gain personal information through phishing emails and fake help lines

COVID-19 Vaccination scams
In this variation, the fraudster will offer to sell the victim a 'COVID-19 vaccine' or treatment. Victims who fall for this scam reveal their personal information and payment information to the scammer. 
In one reported incident, victims in the UK were sent a text message purporting to be from the National Health Service which claimed that they were now eligible to receive a COVID-19 vaccine, but needed to fill their personal details into an online phishing form to book a place on the program. Information lost by the victims included their debit card information, which was then used to withdraw funds from the victim's bank account. COVID-19 vaccination scams have been reported in various countries including the United Kingdom, United States and Singapore.

COVID-19 Testing scams 
In this variation of COVID-19 scams, the fraudster claims they are authorized testing site that could offer COVID-19 test. But it require people to offer their health-related information. US department of Health and Human Services sent fraud alert to the public about fraud schemes.

COVID-19 related stock scams
In the United States, victims were persuaded to buy stocks in companies which were claimed to be about to release a 'miracle cure' for COVID-19 through posts in Facebook. The Independent reported that online adverts claimed to sell "vaccine bonds" purportedly linked to the US drug company and COVID-19 vaccine manufacturer Pfizer, which were sold with a minimum of US$10,000 investment. Pfizer confirmed it had no links to these bonds. 

As of mid-December 2020, the U.S. Securities and Exchange Commission has suspended trading in 36 companies which claimed to have access to COVID-19 related materials such as testing kits and treatments.

Losses
According to the Federal Trade Commission, from the start of the COVID-19 pandemic to April 30, 2020, US$13.44M was lost in total due to coronavirus fraud.

See also
 COVID-19 misinformation
 IRS impersonation scam
 SSA impersonation scam
 Technical support scam

References

2020 hoaxes
COVID-19 misinformation
Confidence tricks
Fraud in the United States
Fraud in Canada
Fraud in the United Kingdom